Lost Cities of the Maya is a 1987 illustrated monograph on Maya archaeology. Co-written by the French Mayanist and iconologist Claude-François Baudez and art historian Sydney Picasso, and published in pocket format by Éditions Gallimard as the  volume in their "Découvertes" collection (known as "Abrams Discoveries" in the United States, and "New Horizons" in the United Kingdom). The book was adapted into a documentary film of the same name in 2000.

Introduction 

As part of the  series in the "Découvertes Gallimard" collection, the authors recounts in the book the rediscovery of Maya civilization, and the study of archaeological sites, objects and documents discovered in the region, from the beginning of the sixteenth century to the twentieth century.

According to the tradition of "Découvertes", which is based on an abundant pictorial documentation and a way of bringing together visual documents and texts, enhanced by printing on coated paper, as commented in L'Express, "genuine monographs, published like art books".

In the choice of pictorial documents, priority is given to originality and novelty, such as the original polychrome plates made by the English explorer Frederick Catherwood, about the "Maya Empire", were gathered for this book. It's almost like a "graphic novel", replete with colour plates.

Contents 
The book opens with a "trailer", that is, a series of full-page archaeological photographs from Alfred Maudslay's , published between 1889 and 1902. The body text is divided into six chapters:

 Chapter I: "Conquistadors and Missionaries";
 Chapter II: "Artists and Adventurers";
 Chapter III: "The Age of the Scholars";
 Chapter IV: "The Photographer-explorers";
 Chapter V: "Symbols in Stone";
 Chapter VI: "From Image to Reality".

The second part of the book, the "Documents", containing a compilation of excerpts divided into five parts:

 Insights of the First Travelers;
 Explorers Rediscover a Lost World;
 Cracking the Code;
 The Quiché Maya's Book of Counsel;
 Ancient Maya, Modern Maya.
 Further Reading;
 List of Illustrations;
 Index.

Reception 
On Babelio, the book gets an average of 3.80/5 based on 22 ratings. Goodreads reported, based on 46 ratings, an average of 3.46 out of 5, indicating "generally positive opinions".

Adaptation 
In 2000, the book was adapted into an documentary film of the same name. A co-production between La Sept-Arte and Trans Europe Film, with the collaboration of Éditions Gallimard, the film was directed by Jean-Claude Lubtchansky, with voice-over narration by François Marthouret and Marc Zammit. It was shot in Mexico and Guatemala, and broadcast on Arte as part of the television programme The Human Adventure. It has been dubbed into German under the title , and subtitled into English and Spanish.

See also 
 Maya city
 Jean-Frédéric Waldeck

References

External links 
  
 

1987 non-fiction books
Mesoamerican studies books
Non-fiction books adapted into films
Découvertes Gallimard
2000 documentary films
French documentary television films
Documentary films about Mesoamerica
Films shot in Mexico
Films shot in Guatemala
2000s French films